Lorenzo Williams (born 15 July 1969) is an American retired professional basketball player, who played eight seasons in the National Basketball Association (NBA).

College career
Born in Ocala, Florida, he attended Polk Community College and Stetson University, both in Florida, and was known for his shot-blocking ability.

Professional career
In the NBA,  Williams, a 6'9" center, played with the Charlotte Hornets (1992, 1994), Orlando Magic (1992), Boston Celtics (1993), Dallas Mavericks (1994–96) and the Washington Bullets/Wizards (1996–2000). During 253 regular season games, he averaged 3 points and 6 rebounds per game, shooting less than 38% from the line. Williams was a top shot blocker in the NBA.

Williams also played in the Global Basketball Association (1991–92), the United States Basketball League (1991, 1992) and the Continental Basketball Association (1992–93 and 1993–94).

Post-retirement
After retiring, Williams worked helping youth to develop basketball skills at University of Central Florida's Five Star Basketball Camp, during the summer.

Personal life
Williams has been married to Tracey Williams since July 13, 1996.

NBA career statistics

Regular season

|-
| style="text-align:left;"| 
| style="text-align:left;"| Charlotte
| 2||0||9.0||.333||–||–||4.5||.0||.0||1.0||1.0
|-
| style="text-align:left;"| 
| style="text-align:left;"| Orlando
| 3||0||3.3||.000||–||–||.7||.0||.3||.3||.0
|-
| style="text-align:left;"| 
| style="text-align:left;"| Boston
| 22||7||6.9||.516||–||.286||2.0||.2||.2||.6||1.5
|-
| style="text-align:left;"| 
| style="text-align:left;"| Orlando
| 3||0||6.3||.167||.000||–||1.3||.7||.7||1.0||.7
|-
| style="text-align:left;"| 
| style="text-align:left;"| Charlotte
| 1||0||19.0||.000||.–||–||4.0||.0||1.0||2.0||.0
|-
| style="text-align:left;"| 
| style="text-align:left;"| Dallas
| 34||11||19.9||.466||–||.429||6.1||.7||.4||1.2||3.2
|-
| style="text-align:left;"| 
| style="text-align:left;"| Dallas
| style="background:#CFECEC; width:1em"|82*||81||29.1||.477||–||.376||8.4||1.5||.6||1.8||4.0
|-
| style="text-align:left;"| 
| style="text-align:left;"| Dallas
| 65||61||27.8||.407||.000||.343||8.0||1.3||.7||1.9||3.0
|-
| style="text-align:left;"| 
| style="text-align:left;"| Washington
| 19||0||13.9||.645||–||.714||3.6||.2||.3||.4||2.4
|-
| style="text-align:left;"| 
| style="text-align:left;"| Washington
| 14||6||7.9||.765||–||.000||1.9||.2||.1||.2||1.9
|-
| style="text-align:left;"| 
| style="text-align:left;"| Washington
| 8||0||9.5||.778||–||–||3.1||.1||.4||.8||1.8
|- class="sortbottom"
| style="text-align:center;" colspan="2"| Career
| 253 || 166 || 21.9 || .469 || .000 || .377 || 6.3 || 1.0 || .5 || 1.4 || 3.0

Playoffs

|-
| style="text-align:left;"| 1993
| style="text-align:left;"| Boston
| 1||0||3.0||1.000||–||–||1.0||.0||.0||.0||2.0
|-
| style="text-align:left;"| 1997
| style="text-align:left;"| Washington
| 2||0||2.5||–||–||–||.0||.0||.0||.0||.0
|-
|- class="sortbottom"
| style="text-align:center;" colspan="2"| Career
| 3||0||2.7||1.000||–||–||.3||.0||.0||.0||.7

References

External links
NBAprofile
NBA career statistics, Basketball Reference
Baskepetdya career data

1969 births
Living people
Basketball players from Florida
Boston Celtics players
Centers (basketball)
Charlotte Hornets players
Dallas Mavericks players
Junior college men's basketball players in the United States
Orlando Magic players
Polk State College alumni
Power forwards (basketball)
Rockford Lightning players
Sportspeople from Ocala, Florida
Stetson Hatters men's basketball players
Undrafted National Basketball Association players
Washington Bullets players
Washington Wizards players
American men's basketball players